Israel has submitted films for the Academy Award for Best International Feature Film since 1964. Despite its relatively small film-making industry, ten Israeli films have been nominated for the Foreign Language Oscar, placing it in the Top Ten most nominated countries of all time. However, as of 2022, no Israeli film has ever won the coveted award.

Since 1991, the Israeli Ophir Award winner for Best Film is automatically designated the Israeli submission for the Oscar. In 2007, Aviva My Love and Sweet Mud tied for the award, necessitating a second round of voting which resulted in the submission of Sweet Mud. In 2008 The Band's Visit won the Ophir Award for Best Film but was disqualified by AMPAS for containing too much English dialogue. The runner-up Beaufort was submitted in its place, resulting in Israel's first Oscar nomination in 23 years.

The most successful Israeli director is this category is Moshé Mizrahi who received two Oscar nominations representing Israel, and whose 1977 film Madame Rosa won the Oscar, representing France. Ephraim Kishon represented Israel twice, and was nominated both times. Joseph Cedar and Savi Gavison have represented Israel in the competition three times each, and Cedar was nominated twice.

Submissions
The Academy of Motion Picture Arts and Sciences has invited the film industries of various countries to submit their best film for the Academy Award for Best Foreign Language Film since 1956. The Foreign Language Film Award Committee oversees the process and reviews all the submitted films. Following this, they vote via secret ballot to determine the five nominees for the award. Below is a list of the films that have been submitted by Israel for review by AMPAS for the Foreign Film Oscar along with the year of the submission and the year of the respective Academy Award ceremony.

In most of the Israeli submissions, the majority of the dialogue was in Hebrew. Films which notably used another language as a primary spoken language are The Glass Cage and Moments (French), Late Marriage (Georgian) and Ajami (the local dialect of Arabic). Many others, including Yana's Friends and Saint Clara, feature a heavy dose of Russian.

The missing years are those in which no film was submitted by Israel.

See also
List of Academy Award winners and nominees for Best Foreign Language Film
Cinema of Israel
List of Palestinian submissions for the Academy Award for Best International Feature Film

Notes

References

External links
The Official Academy Awards Database
The Motion Picture Credits Database
IMDb Academy Awards Page

Israel
Academy